Samuel Holden Jaffe, known professionally as Del Water Gap, is an American musician and record producer based in Brooklyn, New York.

Career 
Jaffe is from Sharon, Connecticut. While at boarding school in Millbrook, New York, Jaffe first recorded as Del Water Gap. The name was inspired by the Delaware Water Gap. He later attended the Clive Davis Institute of Recorded Music at NYU to study music and sound production. Band membership changed often as Jaffe entered college. There, he connected with Maggie Rogers, who played in the first incarnation of Del Water Gap. She was in the band for six months. After two of the people he had started the project with dropped out, Jaffe took on Del Water Gap as a solo project.

Del Water Gap's debut self-titled EP was released in 2012. In 2017, Del Water Gap released the EP 1 (646) 943 2672, named after the number for a burner phone he encouraged fans to call. He released the single "Laid Down My Arms" on Terrible Records in 2018. In 2019, Del Water Gap released the EP Don't Get Dark on Terrible Records.

In 2020, Del Water Gap released "Ode to a Conversation Stuck in Your Throat" and "Mariposa" on Atlantic Records. In July 2020, "Ode to a Conversation Stuck in Your Throat" gained widespread attention after actresses Margaret Qualley and Kaitlyn Dever posted an Instagram video of themselves performing a "socially distant dance party" to the song during the first summer of the COVID-19 pandemic. The song was subsequently covered by singer-songwriter Gracie Abrams on her Instagram page and referred to by actress Florence Pugh as her "favourite song". 

Also in 2020, Jaffe featured on “New Song” with Maggie Rogers as part of her album Notes from the Archive: Recordings 2011–2016. Jaffe also collaborated with Rogers on her second album, Surrender, co-writing and producing the singles "Want Want" and "Anywhere With You" alongside Rogers and Kid Harpoon. He also worked with Claud on the single “My Body” and co-wrote and produced Claud’s “Never Meant To Call”. He also worked with Johnny Orlando on his song "everything i hate about you" from his debut album, all the things that could go wrong, co-writing and producing the song alongside Alexander23.

In 2021, Del Water Gap signed to Mom + Pop Music and FADER Management, and released the singles "Hurting Kind" and "Perfume", with a music videos co-directed by Charlie Plummer. "Sorry I Am" was his first release on Mom + Pop Music. His debut self-titled LP was released with Mom + Pop in October 2021.

Jaffe made his television debut on January 26, 2022 on Late Night with Seth Meyers, ahead of a sold out show at New York City's Webster Hall. He has opened for artists such as girl in red, Jeremy Zucker, Holly Humberstone, Maggie Rogers and Arlo Parks, and played the Governors Ball Music Festival, Lollapalooza and Outside Lands in 2022.

Jaffe has worked with French fashion house Yves Saint Laurent, attending their Spring/Summer Men's 2022 show in Marrakech, Morocco. Saint Laurent also dressed Jaffe for his 2022 Governor's Ball Music Festival performance, as well as the 2022 Harper's Bazaar Icons Party during New York Fashion Week and the 2022 GQ Men of The Year Party.

Performances

Tours

Headlining 
Del Water Gap - North America Tour (2021, 2022) (supported by Alaska Reid, Taylor Janzen & Raffaella)
Del Water Gap - UK + Europe Tour (2022) (supported by Peter Xan)

Supporting 
girl in red - Make It Go Quiet Tour (2022)
Maggie Rogers - Feral Joy Tour (2023)
Jeremy Zucker - MORE NOISE !!!! (2021)
Holly Humberstone - live at the Roxy Theater, Los Angeles, CA, October 6 & 7 (2021)
Arlo Parks - Collapsed In Sunbeams Tour (2022)

Festivals 
Governors Ball Music Festival (2022)
Lollapalooza (2022)
Outside Lands (2022)
M3F Festival (2023)
Hinterland Festival (2023)
Innings Festival (2022)
FORMAT Festival (2022)
All Things Go (2021)
Firefly Music Festival (2021)

Television 
Late Night with Seth Meyers - January 26, 2022

Discography

Studio albums

Extended plays

Singles

As lead artist

As featured artist

Songwriting and production credits

Music videos

References

Further reading 
Del Water Gap Could Have Been “The Baloney Pony” - Interview Magazine

Living people
Musicians from Connecticut
Bedroom pop musicians
Tisch School of the Arts alumni
Year of birth missing (living people)